was a military decoration for meritorious service to the Empire of Japan, formerly awarded to all military personnel who participated in battles in a war.  These war medals and accompanying certificates specifically identify the conflict for which the decoration will have been awarded.

These decorations were effectively abolished during the Allied Occupation of Japan in the post-war years (1945–1951). The plausible re-institution of a modern equivalent was made unlikely by the adoption of Japan's post-war Constitution which disavows the right of the state to engage in aggressive war; but on-going political pressure for an amendment to Article 9 of the Japanese Constitution renders that prospect marginally possible.

Japanese War Medals

1874 Formosa Expedition War Medal

The Japanese expedition of 1874 to Taiwan Province, also referred to as the Taiwan Expedition of 1874, was in response to the Mudan Incident of 1871.  Fifty-four shipwrecked Ryukyuan sailors were killed by Paiwan aborigines in December 1871 in southern Taiwan.  In seeking restitution from Qing China, Japan reached an impasse when the Chinese claimed that they were not responsible for the actions of the aborigines in territory that was nominally under Chinese sovereignty.

The Japanese government sent an expedition of 3,600 soldiers led by Saigō Tsugumichi in May 1874. The Japanese won a decisive victory at the Battle of Stone Gate on 22 May 1874.  Thirty aborigines were either killed or mortally wounded in the battle, and a great number wounded.  Japanese casualties were six killed and thirty wounded.

In November 1874 the Japanese forces withdrew from Taiwan after the Qing government agreed to an indemnity of 500,000 Kuping taels.

1894–95 Sino-Japanese War Medal

The First Sino–Japanese War, which lasted from 1 August 1894 to 17 April 1895, was fought between Qing Dynasty China and Meiji Japan, primarily over control of Korea. After more than six months of continuous successes by the Japanese army and naval forces, as well as the loss of the Chinese port of Weihai, the Qing leadership sued for peace in February 1895.

1900 Boxer War Medal

Imperial Edict No. 142 was issued on April 21, 1901 ordering a commemorative medal for those who had participated in the relief of the Beijing legations during the Boxer Rebellion.

1904–05 Russo-Japanese War Medal

A unique jūgun kishō was ordered on March 31, 1906 by Imperial Edict No. 51 in recognition of those who served in the war which occurred during the 37th and 38th years of the Meiji period -- Meiji 37-38 (1904–1905).  This is more commonly known as the Russo-Japanese War.

A rough translation of the body of the document explains:

 "A medal of honor (jūgun kishō) is hereby given, on March 30, 1906, to Ernesto Burzagli, Lieutenant of the Italian Navy, on application by the Naval Minister of Japan and with the Emperor's approval, pursuant to the Regulation Relating to the Medals Honoring Participation in Battles (1904-05). Dated April 1, 1906." 

 "After review of this certificate, [the presentation to Lt. Bruzagli of the Medal] has been recorded on the Roll of Medals of Honor." 

An image of the front of the medal itself is shown at the bottom center of the certificate—crossed Army and Navy flags on either side of the Imperial Crysanthemum crest above and the Imperial Paulownia crest below.

Although it is not clear from the certificate whether Lt. Bruzagli did in fact participate in the battles or the award was honorary, we know from photographic sources that he was aboard one of the ships which contributing to the naval bombardment and blockade of Port Arthur in 1904.  He was with the Japanese naval forces which aided in the capture of that strategic objective.  Photographic records also place Burzagli with the entourage of the Japanese Minister of the Navy visiting the captured city of Dalny, just north of Port Arthur in January 1905. and with the occupying Japanese forces in January 1905.

1914–1920 First World War Medal

Japanese participation in World War I was commemorated by medals created on November 6, 1915 by Imperial Edict No. 203.  Two very similar medals were issued, one for service in 1914-15 and the other for the period 1914-20.  If a person earned both they could only wear the latter.

Allied First World War Victory Medal

Established by Imperial Edict #406 on 17 September 1920, it was one of the series of Inter-allied Victory Medals created and awarded by the victorious allies after World War I. Thirteen nations in all issued a version of the medal.

1931–1934 China Incident War Medal

1937–1945 China Incident War Medal

 medal was created by Imperial Edit No. 496 on July 27, 1939; and was awarded for service in China at any time from the 12th through the 20th years of the  Shōwa period -- Shōwa 12-20 (1937–1945). An amendment was promulgated by Imperial Edict No. 418 in 1944; and the decoration was abolished in 1946 by government ordinance No. 177.

Although the Japanese government still uses "China Incident" in formal documents, albeit with the word Shina (支那) replaced in the present by Chūgoku (中国), media in Japan often paraphrase it with other expressions like     . The word Shina is now construed by China as a derogatory term.

1941–1945 Great East Asia War Medal

 was created on June 21, 1944 by Imperial Edict No. 417.  Because of the late date in the war it appears none were actually awarded to veterans.  However many later replicas exist.

Selected recipients

Navy
 Tōgō Heihachirō, 1906.
 Ernesto Burzagli, Italian Military Attaché, 1906.

Army
 Jeremiah Richard Wasson, American Military Attaché, 1875.<ref>"A Victory for the Chinese; Japanese Driven with Heavy Loss from Ping-yang", New York Times, August 22, 1894.</ref>

 Kodama Gentarō, 1906.
 Kuroki Tamemoto, 1906.
 Ian Standish Monteith Hamilton, British Indian Military Attaché, 1906.
 John Charles Hoad, Australian Military Attaché, 1906.
 Herbert Cyril Thacker, Canadian Military Attaché, 1906.
 Granville Roland Fortescue, American Military Attaché, 1906.
 Masanobu Tsuji, 1939.
 Teruo Nakamura, 1974.
 Hiroo Onoda, 1974.
 Shoichi Yokoi, 1972.

Notes

See also
 , Meiji 28-29 (1894–1895)
 , Taishō 3-7, (1914–1918)
 , Shōwa 6-20 (1931–1945).
 , Shōwa 12-20 (1937–1945).
 , Shōwa 16-20 (1941–1945).
 , Shōwa 16-20 (1941–1945).

References
 Peterson, James W., Barry C. Weaver and Michael A. Quigley. (2001). Orders and Medals of Japan and Associated States. San Ramon, California: Orders and Medals Society of America. 
 Rottman, Gordon L. and Michael Welply. (2005).  Japanese Infantryman 1937-45: Sword of the Empire. Oxford: Osprey Publishing. 

External links
 Japan, Cabinet Office: Decorations and Medals—the Jūgun kishō'' is unmentioned in current system of honors
 Japan Mint: Production Process
 Japanese War Medals of WWI
  Japanese War Medals of WWII

Military awards and decorations of Japan
Military of the Empire of Japan